Nicholas Gregory Mankiw (born February 3, 1958) is an American macroeconomist who is currently the Robert M. Beren Professor of Economics at Harvard University. Mankiw is best known in academia for his work on New Keynesian economics.

Mankiw has written widely on economics and economic policy. , the RePEc overall ranking based on academic publications, citations, and related metrics put him as the 45th most influential economist in the world, out of nearly 50,000 registered authors. He was the 11th most cited economist and the 9th most productive research economist as measured by the h-index. In addition, Mankiw is the author of several best-selling textbooks, writes a popular blog, and has since 2007 written approximately monthly for the Sunday business section of The New York Times. According to the Open Syllabus Project, Mankiw is the most frequently-cited author on college syllabi for economics courses.

Mankiw is a conservative and has been an economic adviser to several Republican politicians. From 2003 to 2005, Mankiw was Chairman of the Council of Economic Advisers under President George W. Bush. In 2006, he became an economic adviser to Mitt Romney, and worked with Romney during his presidential campaigns in 2008 and 2012. In October 2019, he announced that he was no longer a Republican because of his discontent with President Donald Trump and the Republican Party.

Early life and education
Mankiw was born in Trenton, New Jersey. His grandparents were all Ukrainians. He grew up in Cranford, New Jersey, where he worked in Republican politics, and graduated from the Pingry School in 1976. In 1975, he studied astrophysics at the Summer Science Program. He graduated from Princeton University summa cum laude in 1980 with a Bachelor of Arts in economics. Mankiw completed a 72-page long senior thesis titled "Understanding Employment Fluctuation." At Princeton, Mankiw was classmates with the economist David Romer, who would later become one of his coauthor, and was roommates with the playwright Richard Greenberg.

After college, Mankiw spent a year working on his Doctor of Philosophy at the Massachusetts Institute of Technology (MIT) and a subsequent year studying at Harvard Law School. He worked as a staff economist for the Council of Economic Advisers from 1982 to 1983, which foreshadowing his later position as its chairman. After leaving the council, he earned his PhD in economics from MIT in 1984 under the supervision of Stanley Fischer. He returned to Harvard Law for a year, but having completed his PhD and realizing that he was better at economics, he left to teach at MIT for a year and then became an assistant professor of economics at Harvard University in 1985. He was promoted to full professor in 1987, at the age of 29.

Academic writings
Mankiw is widely considered as a New Keynesian economist although at least one financial journalist states that he resists such easy categorisation. Mankiw did important work on menu costs, which are a source of price stickiness. His paper "Small Menu Costs and Large Business Cycles: A Macroeconomic Model of Monopoly," which was published in the Quarterly Journal of Economics in 1985, compared a firm's private incentive to adjust prices because of a shock to nominal aggregate demand to that decision's the social welfare implications. The paper concluded that expansion in aggregate demand may either increase welfare or reduce it, but the welfare reduction is never greater than the menu cost. A contraction in aggregate demand, however, reduces welfare, possibly in an amount much larger than the menu cost. In other words, from a social planner's point of view, prices may be stuck too high but never too low. The paper was a building block for work by Olivier Blanchard and Nobuhiro Kiyotaki on aggregate-demand externalities and for work by Laurence M. Ball and David Romer on the interaction between real and nominal rigidities.

In 2002, Mankiw and Ricardo Reis proposed an alternative to the widely-used New Keynesian Phillips curve that is based on the slow diffusion of information among the population of price setters. Their sticky-information model displays three related properties that are more consistent with accepted views about the effects of monetary policy. Firstly, disinflations are always contractionary although announced disinflations are less contractionary than surprise ones. Secondly, monetary policy shocks have their maximum impact on inflation with a substantial delay. Thirdly, the change in inflation is positively correlated with the level of economic activity.

A related 2003 article by Mankiw, Reis, and Justin Wolfers analyzed data on inflation expectations and documented substantial disagreement among both consumers and professional economists about expected future inflation. That disagreement is shown to vary over time and to move with inflation, the absolute value of the change in inflation, and relative price variability. The paper argues that a satisfactory model of economic dynamics must address those business-cycle moments. Noting that most macroeconomic models do not endogenously generate disagreement, they show that a sticky-information model broadly matches many of those facts. The model is also consistent with other observed departures of inflation expectations from full rationality, including autocorrelated forecast errors and insufficient sensitivity to recent macroeconomic news.

Mankiw has also written several papers on the empirical analysis of consumer behavior and often emphasizes the role of heterogeneity. An article coauthored with John Campbell in 1989 found that the aggregate consumption data are best described by a model in which about half of consumers obey the permanent income hypothesis, and half simply consume their current income, which is sometimes called hand-to-mouth behavior. An article coauthored with Stephen Zeldes in 1991 found the consumption of stockholders to covary more strongly with the stock market than the consumption of nonstockholders did. That provided a possible explanation for the equity premium puzzle.

Mankiw's most widely-cited paper is "A Contribution to the Empirics of Economic Growth," which was coauthored with David Romer and David Weil and published in the Quarterly Journal of Economics in 1992. The paper argues that the Solow growth model, once augmented to include a role for human capital, explains reasonably well international differences in standards of living. According to Google Scholar, it has been cited more than 20,000 times, which makes it one of the most cited articles in the field of economics.

Beyond his work in macroeconomics, Mankiw has also written several other notable papers. In 1989, he coauthored a paper with David Weil that examined the demographic determinants of housing demand and predicted that the aging of baby boomers would undermine the housing market in the 1990s and 2000s. In 1986, he coauthored a paper with Michael Whinston in microeconomic theory that showed that under imperfect competition, entry tends to be excessive in homogeneous-goods industries because entrants fail to take into account the business-stealing externality that they impose on their rivals. When goods are heterogeneous, it is ambiguous whether free entry produces too many or too few firms because of offsetting business-stealing and product-variety externalities.

Textbooks
Mankiw has written two popular college-level textbooks: the intermediate-level Macroeconomics (now in its 11th edition, published by Worth Publishers) and the more famous introductory text Principles of Economics (now in its 9th edition, published by Cengage). Subsets of chapters from the latter book are sold under the titles Principles of Microeconomics, Principles of Macroeconomics, Brief Principles of Macroeconomics, and Essentials of Economics. The book was signed for a record advance. The New York Times reported in 1995 that Mankiw "was offered a $1.4 million advance by Harcourt Brace in Fort Worth to write a basic economics textbook. "That's about three times as big as any other in the college textbook market and rivals those of all but a few celebrity authors."

When the first edition of the Principles book was published in 1997, The Economist magazine stated,

Since then, more than one million copies have been sold, and Mankiw has received an estimated $42 million in royalties from the book, which is priced at $280 per copy.

Other career activities
In May 2003, President George W. Bush appointed Mankiw as Chairman of the Council of Economic Advisers. Mankiw served in that post from 2003 to 2005 and was followed by Harvey S. Rosen and then Ben Bernanke. As chairman, Mankiw was part of a George W. Bush administration effort seeking greater oversight of two government-sponsored enterprises: Fannie Mae and Freddie Mac. In a November 2003 speech to a conference of bank supervisors, he said:

The proposed regulatory reforms were passed into law only years later, when the financial crisis of 2007–2008 was well underway.

After leaving the CEA, Mankiw resumed teaching at Harvard and took over one of the most popular classes at Harvard College, the introductory economics course Ec 10, from Martin Feldstein. He has become an influential figure in the blogosphere and online journalism since launching his eponymous blog. The blog, which was originally designed to assist his Ec10 students, has gained a readership that extends far beyond students of introductory economics. Subtitled "Random Observations for Students of Economics," it was ranked the top economics blog by US economics professors in a 2011 survey.

In November 2006, Mankiw became an official economic adviser to Massachusetts Governor Mitt Romney's political action committee, Commonwealth PAC. In 2007, he signed on as an economic adviser to Romney's presidential campaign. He continued in that role during Romey's 2012 presidential bid.

From 2012 to 2015, Mankiw served as chairman of the Harvard economics department.

In February 2013, Mankiw publicly supported same-sex marriage in the United States in an amicus brief submitted to the US Supreme Court.

Mankiw is a trustee of the Urban Institute. In 2016, he became a member of the US Partnership on Mobility from Poverty, an effort funded by the Bill and Melinda Gates Foundation and run by the Urban Institute. The group of 24 scholars and activists is "a new collaborative aimed at discovering permanent ladders of mobility for the poor. The partnership will identify breakthrough solutions that can be put into action by philanthropy, practitioners, and the public and private sectors."

2004 Economic Report of the President
Several controversies arose from CEA's February 2004 Economic Report of the President. In a press conference, Mankiw spoke of the gains from free trade and noted that outsourcing of jobs by US companies is "probably a plus for the economy in the long run." Thar reflected mainstream economic analysis but was criticized by many politicians, who drew a link between outsourcing and the slow recovery of the US labor market in early 2004.

Controversy also arose from a rhetorical question posed by the report and repeated by Mankiw in a speech about the report: "when a fast-food restaurant sells a hamburger, is it providing a service or combining inputs to manufacture a product?" He intended to point out that the distinction between manufacturing jobs and service industry jobs is somewhat arbitrary and so is a poor basis for policy. Even though the issue was not raised in the report, a news account led to criticism that the administration was seeking to cover up job losses in manufacturing by redefining jobs like cooking hamburgers as manufacturing.

2011 student walkout
On November 2, 2011, a number of students in Mankiw's Economics 10 class walked out of his lecture. Several dozen of the 750 students participated. Before leaving, they handed Mankiw an open letter critical of his course that stated in part:
{{blockquote|we found a course that espouses a specific—and limited—view of economics that we believe perpetuates problematic and inefficient systems of economic inequality in our society today.... Economics 10 makes it difficult for subsequent economics courses to teach effectively as it offers only one heavily skewed perspective rather than a solid grounding on which other courses can expand.... Harvard graduates play major roles in the financial institutions and in shaping public policy around the world. If Harvard fails to equip its students with a broad and critical understanding of economics, their actions are likely to harm the global financial system. The last five years of economic turmoil have been proof enough of this.<ref>"An Open Letter to Greg Mankiw" , 'Harvard Political Review, November 2, 2011</ref>}}

The students concluded their letter by stating that they would instead be attending the underway Occupy Boston demonstration. Counterprotesters showed up in that class, and Mankiw replied to his students in an article in The New York Times. An editorial in the student-run Harvard Crimson condemned the protest by
stating:

2016 opposition to Donald Trump

In August 2016, Mankiw expressed opposition to the election of Donald Trump to the presidency. On his blog, he wrote:

2019 departure from Republican Party
On October 28, 2019, Mankiw left the Republican Party and registered as an independent by citing his disappointment in the party's overlooking of President Trump's misdeeds and a wish to vote in either primary in his home state, Massachusetts.

Advocacy of Pigovian taxation
Throughout his career, Mankiw has advocated the implementation of Pigovian taxes, such as a revenue-neutral carbon tax, to correct for externalities.http://scholar.harvard.edu/files/mankiw/files/smart_taxes.pdf  Toward that end, he founded on his blog the informal Pigou Club. In 2016, he had a part in the Leonardo DiCaprio film Before the Flood, a documentary about global climate change, and was interviewed in the film on carbon taxation. In 2017, Mankiw was one of eight "Republican elder statesmen" to propose for conservatives embrace of a policy of carbon taxes, with all revenue rebated as lump-sum dividends. The group also included James A. Baker III, Martin S. Feldstein, Henry M. Paulson Jr., and George P. Shultz.

Honors and awards
 2007: Mankiw was elected a member of the American Academy of Arts and Sciences. 
 2009: Mankiw became president of the Eastern Economic Association; he succeeded Joseph Stiglitz and was followed by Paul Krugman.
 2011: A survey of economics professors named Mankiw their second favorite living economist under the age of 60, just after Paul Krugman and just before Daron Acemoglu.
 2012: The Princeton Review named Mankiw one of the 300 best professors in the nation.https://hedp.osu.edu/sites/hedp.osu.edu/files/news-bestprofessors.pdf  
 2014: Along with David Card, Mankiw was elected vice president of the American Economic Association. 
 2017: The Council for Economic Education honored Mankiw with its Visionary Award.
 2019: Omicron Delta Epsilon, the international honor society for economics, awarded Mankiw the biennial John R. Commons Award.

In popular culture
Mankiw is referenced in the 2011 film Elles, which shows an episode in the life of Anne (Juliette Binoche), a journalist writing an article about female student prostitution. When asked about her classes, one of the students, the Polish immigrant Alicja (Joanna Kulig), replies that she has been studying the neoliberal economist Greg Mankiw.

In addition, Mankiw is briefly mentioned in the novels Nineteen Minutes by Jodi Picoult and The Female Persuasion by Meg Wolitzer.

On February 18, 2019, Mankiw was mentioned in a clue on the television show Jeopardy!: "N. Gregory Mankiw has penned texts on these 'large' and 'small' fields, relating to how governments spend & how you do."

Personal life
Mankiw lives in Massachusetts with his wife Deborah, to whom he has been married since 1984. They have three children, Catherine, Nicholas and Peter, and a dog, Tobin.

Selected bibliography
 
 
 
 
 
 

References

External links

  of Greg Mankiw's (blog)
 Mankiw's page at Harvard University
 
 I Can Afford Higher Taxes. But They'll Make Me Work Less. by N. Gregory Mankiw, The New York Times'', 9 October 2010.

1958 births
American male non-fiction writers
American people of Ukrainian descent
American textbook writers
Environmental economists
Harvard Law School alumni
Harvard University faculty
Living people
Macroeconomists
MIT School of Humanities, Arts, and Social Sciences alumni
New Keynesian economists
People from Cranford, New Jersey
Pingry School alumni
Princeton University alumni
Summer Science Program
Writers from Trenton, New Jersey
20th-century American economists
21st-century American economists
Fellows of the American Academy of Arts and Sciences
Urban Institute people
National Bureau of Economic Research
21st-century American non-fiction writers
Economists from New Jersey
American male bloggers
American bloggers
Massachusetts Republicans
Chairs of the United States Council of Economic Advisers